"Don't Start Me Talkin'" (also called "Don't Start Me to Talkin'") is a blues song written and performed by Sonny Boy Williamson II. It was Williamson's first single recorded for Checker Records, and reached number three in the US Billboard R&B chart in 1955.

Recording background 
After Trumpet Records folded, on August 12, 1955, Sonny Boy Williamson II had his first recording session for Checker Records. "Don't Start Me Talkin'" was recorded at these sessions. Backing Williamson (vocals and harmonica) were Otis Spann on piano, Muddy Waters and Jimmy Rogers on guitar, Willie Dixon on bass, and Fred Below on drums.

Release and chart performance 
"Don't Start Me Talkin'" was released as a single in September 1955, a month after its recording. The song reached number three on Billboard magazine's R&B Singles chart.

Other releases 
Both sides of the single appeared on Williamson's 1959 debut album, Down and Out Blues, which was inducted into the Blues Hall of Fame in 2007.

Other renditions 
James Cotton, who was taught the harmonica by Williamson, recorded "Don't Start Me Talkin'", for the 1967 album, The James Cotton Blues Band. The New York Dolls recorded it for their second studio album, Too Much Too Soon.
Bob Dylan performed the song on The David Letterman Show in 1984. Other music artists that have recorded the song include John Hammond, Jr., the Doobie Brothers, Dion, the Yardbirds, Climax Blues Band, Champion Jack Dupree, Rory Gallagher, Willie "Big Eyes" Smith, Fenton Robinson, Good Rockin' Charles and Gary Moore, among others.

References 

1955 songs
Sonny Boy Williamson II songs
1955 singles
Blues songs
Checker Records singles
The Doobie Brothers songs
The Yardbirds songs
Dion DiMucci songs